Vatica rynchocarpa is a tree in the family Dipterocarpaceae, native to Borneo. The specific epithet rynchocarpa means "snout fruit", referring to the beak-like shape of the nut.

Description

Distribution and habitat
Vatica rynchocarpa is endemic to Borneo.

Conservation
Vatica rynchocarpa has been assessed as endangered on the IUCN Red List. It is threatened mainly by conversion of land for plantations and urban expansion. Logging for its timber also threatens the species.

References

rynchocarpa
Endemic flora of Borneo
Plants described in 1967